Kotka-Hamina sub-region  is a subdivision of Kymenlaakso and one of the Sub-regions of Finland since 2009.

Municipalities
 Kotka
Population: 
 Hamina (Fredrikshamn)
Population: 
 Pyhtää (Pyttis)
Population: 
 Virolahti (Vederlax)
Population: 
 Miehikkälä
Population:

See also
 Kouvola sub-region
 Loviisa sub-region

Sub-regions of Finland
Geography of Kymenlaakso